Lone Wolf is a 1978 Soviet drama film directed by Roman Balayan. It was a part of the Official Selection section at the 28th Berlin International Film Festival.

Plot
Peasant serf Thomas is entrusted with protecting the forest. Thomas has to catch serfs like himself, who come to the forest to hunt or cut wood without the permission of the master. Unsurprisingly the villagers do not like him and nickname him "Biryuk" for his surly and unsociable character. But in reality Thomas is a kind and conscientious man who lives with his young daughter Ulithi a simple life. Utterly devoted to the woods and trying to protect every tree, the main character is mistakenly killed by a gentleman's bullet, who came to the woods to shoot birds and wild boars.

Cast
 Mikhail Golubovich as Biryuk (Thomas)
 Oleg Tabakov as Bersenev
 Yelena Khrol (credited as Lena Khrol) as Ulita
 Yury Dubrovin as First man
 Alexey Zaytsev as Second man
 Irina Borisova
 S. Brzhestovskiy
 Anatoliy Mateshko
 Vladislav Misevich
 Silviya Sergeichikova

References

External links

1978 films
1978 drama films
Soviet drama films
Russian drama films
Films based on works by Ivan Turgenev
Films directed by Roman Balayan